Marl Creek Provincial Park is a provincial park in British Columbia, Canada, located on the Trans-Canada Highway  north of Golden in the Rocky Mountain Trench.

References

Provincial parks of British Columbia
Columbia Country
Columbia River
1961 establishments in British Columbia
Protected areas established in 1961